Bezno is a market town in Mladá Boleslav District in the Central Bohemian Region of the Czech Republic. It has about 1,000 inhabitants.

Etymology
The name is derived from the Czech word bez, i.e. "elderberry".

Geography
It lies in a flat landscape of the Jizera Table. In the centre of Bezno is a pond called Kal.

History
The first written mention of Bezno is from 1088. From 1460 to 1694, Bezno was owned by the knights of Bzenský of Proruba. The greatest development occurred during the rule of the Pachta family, who bought Bezno is 1742. They had built here a new castle and had rebuilt the church.

Sights
The Bezno Castle is a Baroque complex from the mid-18th century, built on the site of an older fortress. Its current form dates from 1817, when it was reconstructed after a fire. Today it is privately owned and unused.

The landmark of the town square is the Church of Saints Peter and Paul. It was built in the Baroque style in 1750–1763.

A valuable building is the former Renaisannce granary. It dates from 1605.

Gallery

References

External links

Market towns in the Czech Republic
Populated places in Mladá Boleslav District